Embedded analytics is the technology designed to make data analysis and business intelligence more accessible by any application or user.

Definition

According to Gartner analysts Kurt Schlegel, in 2008 traditional business intelligence lacked integration and accessibility between data and users. As a result, embedded analytics has been developed to become more pervasive by real-time autonomy and self-service of data visualization or customization.

Embedded analytics software delivers real-time reporting and advanced analytics, including machine learning, directly into an enterprise business application. The data is managed by an analytics platform, and the visualizations and reports are placed directly within the application user interface.

This is in contrast to traditional BI, which requires users to leave their workflow applications to look at data insights in a separate set of tools. This immediacy makes embedded analytics much more intuitive and likely to be viewed by users. A December 2016 report from Nucleus Research found that using BI tools, which require toggling between applications, can take up as much as 1–2 hours of an employee's time each week, whereas embedded analytics eliminate the need to toggle between apps.

History

The term "embedded analytics" was first used by Howard Dresner: consultant, author, former Gartner analyst and inventor of the term "business intelligence". Consolidation of business intelligence "doesn't mean the BI market has reached maturity" said Howard Dresner while he was working for Hyperion Solutions, a company that Oracle bought in 2007. Oracle started then to use the term "embedded analytics" at their press release for Oracle Rapid Planning on 2009. Gartner Group, a company for which Howard Dresner has been working,  finally added the term to their IT Glossary on November 5, 2012. In 2014, Dresner Advisory Services published "Embedded Business Intelligence Market Study" as part of the Wisdom of Crowds Series of Research, including 24 vendors. Embedded BI (Business Intelligence) refers to the integration of business intelligence within business process applications or portals.

References

Types of analytics
analytics
Business intelligence terms
Data management